Hierro may refer to:

People
 Fernando Hierro (born 1968), a former Spanish footballer
 Ignacio Hierro (born 1978), a Mexican footballer for the Atlante F.C.
 Luis Hierro (1915 - 1991), a political figure from Uruguay

Places
 Cueva del Hierro, a municipality in Castile-La Mancha, Spain
 El Hierro, a Spanish island that is part of the Canary Islands
 El Hierro Airport, an airport located on El Hierro island
 Puerta de Hierro (Mexico), a district in Zapopan, Mexico

Other
 Hierro (film), a 2009 psychological thriller directed by Gabe Ibáñez
 El Palacio de Hierro, a chain of department stores in Mexico
 El Hierro Giant Lizard, a species of wall lizard found in El Hierro island
 El Hierro (DO), a Spanish Denominación de Origen for wines from El Hierro island
 Puerta de Hierro (Madrid), a monument in Madrid, Spain
 Hierro (TV series)